Ran Raz is a computer scientist who works in the area of computational complexity theory. He was a professor in the faculty of mathematics and computer science at the Weizmann Institute. He is now a professor of computer science at Princeton University.

Ran Raz received his Ph.D. at the Hebrew University of Jerusalem in 1992 under Avi Wigderson and Michael Ben-Or.

Ran Raz is well known for his work on interactive proof systems.

Ran Raz received the Erdős Prize in 2002. His work has been awarded in the top conferences in theoretical computer science. In 2008, the work  received the best paper award in IEEE Symposium on Foundations of Computer Science (FOCS).

Selected publications

.
.
.
.
.

Notes

Year of birth missing (living people)
Living people
Theoretical computer scientists
Academic staff of Weizmann Institute of Science
Israeli computer scientists
Erdős Prize recipients